The Republican Party was a political party in Iceland.  It was formed in 1953 as the result of the split from the Independence Party. A party with an identical name was officially granted list letter I on 8 March 2013, and started to compose a candidate list for participation in the 2013 Icelandic parliamentary election. It is, however, not the same party that participated in the 1953 election, although the name was chosen as a homage to the party.

Election results

References

Defunct political parties in Iceland
Political parties established in 1953
1953 establishments in Iceland
Political parties with year of disestablishment missing